Thomas Mindermann is a German-born Swiss neurosurgeon and researcher. He was born on March 10, 1955, in Schopfheim, West-Germany. Mindermann arrived in Switzerland in 1975 where he studied medicine at the University of Basel. In 1995, he became board certified as a neurosurgeon in Switzerland.

Research and career 
Mindermann was appointed as a Senior Pituitary Research Fellow in the Department of Neurosurgery at the University of California, San Francisco (UCSF) from 1992 until 1993. He was the first Swiss neurosurgeon applying radiosurgery with both the Gamma Knife and the CyberKnife. Currently, he practices neurosurgery in Zurich, Switzerland and he is on the board of medical directors of Klinik Im Park, Hirslanden, Zurich since 2001.

Publications

External links

References 

1955 births
Living people
University of Basel alumni
Swiss neurosurgeons